The Damtshaa diamond mine is a diamond mine located in Botswana about 220 km (137 miles) west of the city of Francistown. Damtshaa, meaning "water for a tortoise", is owned by Debswana, a partnership between the De Beers company, Aquarius Global Resources and the government of Botswana. It is the newest of four mines operated by the company, officially opening on October 25, 2003.

Damtshaa is of open pit construction, located on top of four distinct kimberlite pipes of varying ore grade. The mine is forecast to produce about 5 million carats (1,000 kg) of diamond from 39 million tons of ore over the projected 31 year life of the mine. In 2003, the Damtshaa mine produced 292,000 carats (58.4 kg). Recovered ore grade averages about 0.6 carats (12 mg) per metric ton. The ore produced at Damtshaa is processed at a processing plant at its sister mine, the Orapa diamond mine, about  distant. The Damtshaa mine is also managed from the Orapa mine, and is included in Orapa's and Letlhakane's safety and environmental programs, meaning that Damtshaa is also ISO 14001 certified. Damtshaa employs around 180 people.

References

 

Diamond mines in Botswana
Diatremes of Botswana
Pre-Holocene volcanoes
Open-pit mines
Surface mines in Botswana